
Year 783 (DCCLXXXIII) was a common year starting on Wednesday  of the Julian calendar. The denomination 783 for this year has been used since the early medieval period, when the Anno Domini calendar era became the prevalent method in Europe for naming years.

Events 
 By place 
 Byzantine Empire 
 A Byzantine expeditionary force under Staurakios, chief minister (logothete), begins a campaign against the communities (Sclaviniae) of Greece. Setting out from Constantinople, the imperial army follows the Thracian coast into Macedonia, and then south into Thessaly, Central Greece and the Peloponnese. Staurakios restores a measure of Byzantine authority over these areas, and collects booty and tribute from the locals.

 Europe 
 Mauregatus of Asturias, illegitimate son of the late king Alfonso I, usurps the throne after the death of his brother-in-law Silo. However, the nobility has elected Alfonso II at Adosinda's (wife of Silo) insistence, but Mauregatus assembles a large army of supporters, and forces Alfonso to flee to Álava (modern Spain). Adosinda is put in the monastery of San Juan de Pravia, where she lives out the rest of her life.
 April 30 – Hildegard, wife of King Charlemagne, dies in childbirth after her ninth confinement in less than 12 years of marriage. His mother, Bertrada of Laon, dies in the summer and is buried with great ceremony beside her husband Pepin the Short, in the Abbey of St. Denis (modern-day Paris).
 October – Charlemagne marries Fastrada, the 18-year-old daughter of a Frankish count named Rudolph, and makes her his queen at Worms. The probable reason behind the marriage is to solidify a Frankish alliance east of the Rhine, against the Saxons in Lower Saxony (modern Germany). 
 Winter – Saxon Wars: Charlemagne defeats the Saxon rebels in a three-day battle next to the Hase River, and perhaps overruns fortifications on the Wittekindsberg, before ravaging southern Saxony. A Frisian uprising against Carolingian rule is supported by Duke Widukind.

Births 
 Wu Yuanji, general of the Tang Dynasty (or 793)

Deaths 
 April 30 – Hildegard, queen consort of Charlemagne (b. 758)
 July 12 – Bertrada of Laon, queen consort of Pepin the Short
 Cynewulf, bishop of Lindisfarne (approximate date)
 Fujiwara no Uona, Japanese minister (b. 721)
 Han Gan, Chinese painter of the Tang Dynasty
 Isa ibn Musa, Muslim governor (or 784)
 Silo, king of Asturias (Spain)

References

Sources